Vanity (Italian:Vanità) is a 1947 Italian historical melodrama film directed by Giorgio Pastina and starring Walter Chiari, Liliana Laine and Dina Galli. The film is based on a play by Carlo Bertolazzi. Chiari was awarded a Nastro d'Argento for best debut performance. It was made at the Icet Studios in Milan.

The film is set in nineteenth century Milan.

Cast

References

External links 

1947 films
1940s Italian-language films
Films directed by Giorgio Pastina
Italian films based on plays
Italian black-and-white films
1940s historical drama films
Italian historical drama films
1947 drama films
1940s Italian films